The You Yangs are a series of granite ridges that rise up to  above the flat and low-lying Werribee Plain in southern Victoria, Australia, approximately  due west of the rural town of Little River,  southwest of Melbourne CBD and  north of Geelong. Much of the southern parts of the ranges are protected by the You Yangs Regional Park.

The You Yangs sits about halfway between the Brisbane Ranges to the west and the nearest coast of the Corio Bay to the southeast. Although only 319 m at its highest (Flinders Peak, at the southern end), it dominates the surrounding landscape and are clearly identifiable from nearby Geelong, Melbourne and beyond.

The You Yangs are home to a geoglyph of Bunjil, a Dreamtime creator deity to some of the Indigenous people of Victoria, depicted as an wedge-tailed eagle. The geoglyph was constructed by the Australian artist Andrew Rogers in recognition of the local Indigenous Wathaurong people. Unveiled in March 2006, the geoglyph has a wing span of 100 metres and 1500 tonnes of rock was used in its construction.

History
The name "You Yang" comes from the Aboriginal words Wurdi Youang or Ude Youang which could have any number of meanings from "big mountain in the middle of a plain", "big or large hill", or "bald". The Woiwurrung word for granite stone 'yow.wong' is also a possibility. The Yawangi people enlarged natural hollows in the rocks to form wells that held water even in dry seasons. The area around the You Yangs was called Morong-morongoo after the murnong that was abundant there in the past.

Explorer Matthew Flinders was the first European to visit the You Yangs. On 1 May 1802, he and three of his men climbed to the highest point. He named it "Station Peak" but the name was changed in 1912 to "Flinders Peak" in his honour.

The You Yangs have always attracted artists to paint them and feature most strongly in works by one of Australia's greatest artists, Fred Williams.  Williams spent long periods developing his plein air representations of the You Yangs, and these have now become classics of Australian art – rugged, dramatic, yet sparse in their imagery – unquestionably of the Australian bush.

The You Yangs were chosen to depict some battle scenes for the HBO WW2 series The Pacific.

Geography
The nearest settlements include;
Balliang - 5 km northwest
Little River - 5 km east
Lara - 7 km south
Geelong - 31.5 km south
Werribee - 37.5 km east

Two watercourses pass through or by the ranges: Hovells Creek originates in the western parts of the ranges, while Little River flows around the ranges to the north and east.

Geology

Contrary to popular belief, the You Yangs are not the remains of a volcano. They are an inselberg or monadnock, and the granite that forms them was originally a mass of magma that had worked its way up into the surrounding sedimentary rocks during the Devonian period, when the land surface in Victoria was several kilometres higher than today.

The magma crystallised before it reached the surface, so it did not produce any volcanic activity. Instead, a very slow cooling rate allowed many large white crystals of feldspar to form. These can be seen in many of the granite outcrops throughout the ranges. In places the crystals appear to be lined up, probably because the gooey magma was still moving around when they were growing. The rock enclosing the big feldspar crystals mainly contains crystals of greyish quartz and two black minerals (hornblende and a variety of mica known as biotite).

There are also some tiny crystals of two minerals, allanite and titanite, that contain radioactive elements such as uranium and thorium. Titanite crystals have been used to calculate that the You Yangs granite solidified 365 million years ago. In many places in the granite there are dark grey clots and lumps. These are called xenoliths and are foreign pieces of sedimentary rock that have been incorporated into the magma as it moved to the location at which it solidified.

The land surface has eroded over the millions of years since the granite solidified, leaving it exposed. Because granite is a hard rock, it has resisted erosion better than the rocks that surrounded it. The size and shape of the rounded tors are controlled by fractures in the granite that resulted from slight shrinkage during cooling. Weathering and erosion of the granite has formed a blanket of sandy soil that covers any contacts with surrounding rocks.

Climate, vegetation and wildlife
Owing to the rain shadow created by the Otway Ranges to the south west, the You Yangs are in the driest part of Victoria south of the Great Dividing Range.

River red gum (Eucalyptus camaldulensis) is the dominant native tree on the low slopes and gullies, yellow gum (E. leucoxylon) grows widely throughout the low and middle slopes, and blue gum (E. pseudoglobulus) grows on the rugged upper slopes. Other native trees in the park include red box (E. polyanthemos), grey box (E. microcarpa) & yellow box (E. melliodora), manna gum (E. viminalis), red ironbark (E. tricarpa), cherry ballart (Exocarpos cupressiformis), and silver and black wattle (Acacia dealbata and A.mearnsii).  Native low vegetation is sparse and dominated by grasses and saltbushes, with some scrubby areas of snowy mintbush (Prostanthera nivea) and drooping cassinia (Cassinia arcuata).

Many introduced plants occur in the You Yangs, some planted deliberately for forestry, including sugar gum (E. cladocalyx), swamp yate (E. occidentalis) and brown mallet (E. astringens), and others that have been introduced accidentally or have invaded the area, for example, boneseed (Chyrsanthemoides monilifera) and bridal creeper (Asparagus asparagoides).

The You Yangs are home to more than 200 bird species such as tawny frogmouths, white-naped, white-plumed, New Holland and brown-headed honeyeaters, kookaburras, white-winged choughs, crested shriketits, eastern rosellas, crimson rosellas, purple-crowned lorikeets, sulphur-crested cockatoos, eastern yellow robins, jacky winters and scarlet robins.

Mammals living in the park include eastern grey kangaroos, echidnas, swamp wallabies, sugar gliders, brushtail and ringtail possums, and koalas.

Koalas in the You Yangs have been studied since 2006. In approximately 28% of the Park they are monitored by a non-intrusive system of nose pattern identification.  The entire population was considered to number around 105 in 2017, down 35% from estimated 161 in 2007. The population has been recorded to prefer to roost in river red gum (Eucalyptus camaldulensis): 34% of sightings occur in that species. Four generations of one koala family have been recorded.

The nearby Serendip Sanctuary, a Victorian government wildlife research centre, open to the public, has been involved in breeding endangered Victorian wildlife species, such as the Australian bustard and the brolga (Antigone rubicundus).

Outdoor activities 
The foothills to the north of the peaks are home to Ford Australia's proving ground and SSAA's Eagle Park shooting range.  There is also a paintball facility next to the SSAA range that is open to both adults and young people.

Camping is not permitted in the You Yangs, although picnics are allowed.  Hiking is popular in the You Yangs, and the Mountain to Mouth (M~M) event is a bi-annual two-day  art walk starting from the You Yangs towards the Barwon River mouth in Geelong, celebrating the contemporary song lines of the Wadawurrung people and recognising their land and traditions.  Autumn and winter are also considered the perfect mountain biking and horse riding conditions, as the increased rainfall makes the trails less dusty and soil more firm, thus more ideal for riding.

The You Yangs is home to a free 5 km parkrun event.  You Yangs parkrun starts at 8am every Saturday near the Kurrajong Plantation car park.  Permanent signage marks the 5 km loop course for use at any time.

See also

List of mountains in Victoria

References 
Information Sheet - The You Yangs, Museum Victoria. Retrieved 11 September 2009.

Geography of Geelong
Mountains of Victoria (Australia)
Tourist attractions in Geelong
Mountains of Barwon South West (region)